Counter-Strike: Source  is a tactical first-person shooter video game developed by Valve and Turtle Rock Studios. Released in October 2004 for Windows, it is a remake of Counter-Strike (2000) using the Source game engine. As in the original, Counter-Strike: Source pits a team of counter-terrorists against a team of terrorists in a series of rounds. Each round is won either by completing an objective (such as detonating a bomb or rescuing hostages) or by eliminating all members of the enemy team. The game was initially bundled with all retail and digital copies of Half-Life 2, before being released standalone.

Gameplay

Counter-Strike: Source retains its team-based objective-orientated first-person shooter style gameplay. The aim of playing a map is to accomplish a map's objective: defusing the bomb, rescuing all hostages, or killing the entire opposing team. The ultimate goal of the game is to win more rounds than the opposing team. Once players are killed, they do not respawn until the next round, though this depends on which server people play on. This gameplay feature distinguishes Counter-Strike from other first-person shooter games, where players respawn instantly or after a short delay.

Shooting while moving dramatically decreases accuracy, and holding the trigger down to continuously shoot produces severe recoil. The severity of damage induced by weaponry is dependent upon the specific locations of hits, with hits to the head being most lethal and shots which make contact elsewhere causing lesser loss of health. Damage is also affected by the distance, and if the target wears protection.

Development
Counter-Strike: Source was initially released as a beta to members of the Valve Cyber Café Program on August 11, 2004. On August 18, 2004, the beta was released to owners of Counter-Strike: Condition Zero as well as those who had received a Half-Life 2 voucher bundled with some ATI Radeon video cards. The game was included with Half-Life 2 bundles, which were released on November 16, 2004.

On October 11, 2006, Valve released an experimental update entitled Dynamic Weapons Pricing. Under this system, item prices are determined based on their demand the previous week.

On March 5, 2010, Valve announced the release of games from its first-party library, including games from the Counter-Strike series, for Mac OS X. The ports were slated for release in April 2010. Valve employed Hidden Path Entertainment to provide support on updating Counter-Strike: Source. On May 7, 2010, Valve released an update that includes new features and functionality developed in collaboration with Hidden Path Entertainment. These include 144 (now 146) new achievements, a new domination and revenge system, similar to that of Team Fortress 2, player stats, an upgrade to the Source engine and more. On June 23, 2010, Valve released the beta to the public alongside the promised OS X version. On February 5, 2013, Valve released a port of Counter-Strike: Source for Linux.

Modifications

Counter-Strike: Malvinas 

Counter-Strike: Malvinas is a multiplayer first-person shooter modification of Counter-Strike: Source, developed and distributed by Argentine web hosting company Dattatec. The mod was released worldwide on 4 March 2013 and utilizes the Source game engine. The game is set in Stanley, the capital of the Falkland Islands, and revolves around a group of Argentine special forces capturing the archipelago from British "terrorists". The objective of the game is similar to that of the Counter-Strike series; each round is won by either detonating a bomb or by eliminating all members of the enemy team. Counter-Strike: Malvinas pays homage to the 1982 Falklands War, in which an estimated 650 Argentine and 255 British servicemen died. The mod prompted strong controversy in the United Kingdom; Dattatec's website was targeted by British hackers on 27 March 2013.

Reception

Counter-Strike: Source was met with positive reviews from professional critics. Metacritic, a review aggregator website, awarded Source a rating of 88 out of a possible 100 based on 9 critic's reviews. Jeff Haynes of IGN said the game was "much more detailed, featuring many more polygons per model, bump mapping and other graphical enhancements" compared to the original.

Sequel

On August 12, 2011, Valve announced the production of a successor to Counter-Strike: Source, entitled Counter-Strike: Global Offensive. Global Offensives development began in March 2010 when Hidden Path Entertainment attempted to port Counter-Strike: Source onto video game consoles prior to the end of its lifespan. During its development, Valve saw the opportunity to turn the port into a full game and expand on the predecessor's gameplay.

Competitive play

Counter-Strike: Source has been played in tournaments since shortly after its release. The game received some criticism by the competitive community, who believed the game's skill ceiling was significantly lower than that of CS 1.6. This caused a divide in the competitive community as to which game to play competitively.

References

2004 video games
Asymmetrical multiplayer video games
Counter-Strike
Tactical shooter video games
Esports games
Linux games
Multiplayer online games
MacOS games
Source (game engine) games
Valve Corporation games
Video game remakes
Video games about police officers
Video games about the Special Air Service
Video games about the United States Navy SEALs
Video games developed in the United States
Windows games